That Healin' Feelin' may refer to:

 That Healin' Feelin' (Richard "Groove" Holmes album), 1968
 ''That Healin' Feelin''' (Horace Silver album), 1970